Ewing Marion Kauffman (September 21, 1916 August 1, 1993) was an American pharmaceutical entrepreneur, philanthropist, and Major League Baseball owner.

Early life and education
Ewing Kauffman was born on September 21, 1916, on a farm near Garden City, Missouri. He was the son of John S. Kauffman and  Effie May Winders, who were German-Americans. When Kauffman was a child, his father was in a farming accident which left him blind in his right eye. Following the accident, his father relocated the family to Kansas City, where he worked as a life insurance salesman.

As a child, Kauffman loved reading. When he was 11, he had to leave school for a year, due to a heart valve that would not close completely. During this year, Kauffman taught himself how to speed read. It was not uncommon for him to read one to two books a day. In later years, Kauffman believes his success in the pharmaceutical business stemmed from his ability to read quickly. In 1928, when Kauffman was 12, his parents divorced. He lived with his mother, and his father remained active in his life. On days spent with his father, it was not uncommon for the two  to compete in arithmetic competitions, the most common game being adding, subtracting, multiplying, and dividing the numbers on license plates.

Kauffman was an active youth who participated in various sports, and performed very well in school. He was also an Eagle Scout and later, in adulthood, was  awarded the Distinguished Eagle Scout Award.

Kauffman graduated from Kansas City's Westport High School in 1934 and later attended Kansas City Junior College, He received his associate degree in Business Management.

Career

Military 
In 1942, Kauffman joined the military and served in the U.S. Navy as a signalman. He served in both Europe and the Philippines; after his discharge in 1945, he returned to Kansas City.

Lincoln Laboratories 
In 1947, Kauffman became a commissioned salesman for Lincoln Laboratories, a pharmaceutical company based in Decatur, Illinois. Kauffman earned a  20 percent commissions on his sales, and eventually earned more than the president of the company. Kauffman became angry with the company and left in 1950 after it decreased his sales territory and cut his commission.

Marion Laboratories 
After leaving Lincoln Laboratories, Kauffman formed Marion Laboratories with a $5,000 investment. The company was originally run out of his house, and there were four employees, consisting of Kauffman and his close friends. He reportedly chose to use his middle name, rather than his surname, in order to not appear to be a one-man operation.

With Kauffman as chairman, Marion Laboratories had revenues of $930 million in 1988, the year before it merged with Merrell Dow Pharmaceuticals to form Marion Merrell Dow. Kauffman became chairman emeritus of the new company. The company sale created more than 300 millionaires.

Ewing Marion Kauffman Foundation
Kauffman established the Ewing Marion Kauffman Foundation in the mid-1960s with the same sense of opportunity he brought to his business endeavors, and, with the same convictions. Kauffman wanted his foundation to be innovative to fundamentally change people's lives. He wanted to help young people, especially those from disadvantaged backgrounds, get a quality education that would enable them to reach their full potential. He saw building enterprise as one of the most effective ways to realize individual promise and spur the economy. Today, the mission of the Kauffman Foundation follows his vision by focusing its grant making and operations on two areas: advancing entrepreneurship and improving the education of children and youth.

Kansas City Royals

On November 8, 2007, he was nominated to enter the Baseball Hall of Fame as part of the 2008 class; but was not elected.  He was later nominated and elected to the Kansas Sports Hall of Fame in 2018.

Project Choice
In 1988, Kauffman launched Project Choice to the Westport High School Class of 1992.  Project Choice promised to fund post-secondary education to all students who stayed in school, did not use drugs, did not become pregnant, and were committed to being an upstanding citizen in the community.  To be eligible for the program, parents also had to agree to be involved in their child's education by attending meetings and participating in parent/teacher organizations and other activities. The program remained active until 2001. During those years, it expanded to five other high schools in the Kansas City metro area.

Kauffman Stadium

The stadium's prominent features include water fountains beyond the outfield fence and a ten-story-high scoreboard shaped like the Royals crest, topped by a gold crown.

Personal life
In 1962, he married Muriel Irene McBrien.

Death
Suffering from bone cancer, he died, age 76,  at his home in Mission Hills, Kansas, a suburb of Kansas City.  His remains are interred at the Ewing and Muriel Kauffman Memorial Garden next to the remains of his wife, who died in 1995.

Awards and honors
 1932 – Distinguished Eagle Scout Award as a member of Boy Scout Troop and Ship 100 at Faxon School in Kansas City, Missouri
 1968 – Golden Plate Award of the American Academy of Achievement
 1993 – Kauffman Stadium, home to the Kansas City Royals of Major League Baseball, named after Ewing Kauffman
 2018 – Kansas Sports Hall of Fame

See also

 List of entrepreneurs
 List of people from Johnson County, Kansas

References

External links
Baseball Hall of Fame – 2008 Veterans Committee candidate profile
Kauffman eVenturing
The Kauffman Fellows Program
The iBridge Network

1916 births
1993 deaths
20th-century American businesspeople
American chairpersons of corporations
American chemical industry businesspeople
American company founders
American health care businesspeople
United States Navy personnel of World War II
American sports executives and administrators
Businesspeople from Kansas
Businesspeople from Missouri
Businesspeople in the pharmaceutical industry
Deaths from cancer in Kansas
Deaths from bone cancer
Education activists
Kansas City Royals owners
Patrons of schools
People from Mission Hills, Kansas
People from Cass County, Missouri
Sportspeople from Kansas City, Missouri
20th-century American philanthropists
Philanthropists from the Kansas City metropolitan area